One Piece: Unlimited may refer to:
One Piece: Unlimited Adventure
One Piece: Unlimited Cruise
One Piece: Unlimited World Red